Around the World is Taiwanese Mandopop artist Will Pan's fifth Mandarin studio album. It was released by Universal Music Taiwan on 23 June 2006.

It features 11 new studio tracks with 2 duets: "戴上我的愛" (Wear My Love) with Wang Luo Dan and "我想更慬你" (I Wanna Understand You More) with Su Rui, the one who previously sings "Any Empty Wine Bottles for Sale?" from Papa, Can You Hear Me Sing. A second edition Around the World (CD+DVD) was released on 3 August 2006 with a DVD containing four music videos.

The track "反轉地球" (Around The World) was nominated for Top 10 Gold Songs at the Hong Kong TVB8 Awards, presented by television station TVB8, in 2006.

Track listing

Music video
 "反轉地球" (Around The World) MV
 "謝謝" (Thank You) MV
 "戴上我的愛" (Wear My Love) MV
 "來電" (Incoming Call) MV
 "我想更懂你" MV
 "著迷" MV
 "機會" MV

Notes

References

External links
  Will Pan discography@Universal Music Taiwan

2006 albums
Will Pan albums
Universal Music Taiwan albums